"Anything for You" is Bonnie Pink's twenty-seventh single from the album Thinking Out Loud. The single was released under the Warner Music Japan label on March 28, 2007.

Track listing
Anything for You
Love Song (Remix Version) M-Flo loves Bonnie Pink
Anything for You (Instrumental)

Charts

Oricon Sales Chart

2007 singles
2007 songs
Bonnie Pink songs
Warner Music Japan singles
Songs written by Bonnie Pink